Luh or LUH is an informal expression of getting shocked and not believing what the people are saying. It is commonly used in the Philippines.

Places
 Velký Luh, a village and municipality in the Czech Republic
 Łuh, a village in Subcarpathian Voivodeship of Poland
 Luh, Velykyi Bereznyi Raion, a village in Velykyi Bereznyi Raion, Zakarpattia Oblast, Ukraine

Other uses
 Leibniz University Hannover, Germany
 Light Utility Helicopter or Eurocopter UH-72 Lakota
 HAL Light Utility Helicopter
 LUH, a British-Dutch band featuring Ellery Roberts of WU LYF and Ebony Hoorn

People with the surname
 Bor S. Luh (1916–2001), Chinese-born American food scientist